The 2013 NCAA Division III men's basketball tournament was a single-elimination tournament of 62 teams held to determine the men's collegiate basketball national champion of National Collegiate Athletic Association (NCAA) Division III. It began on March 2, 2013, and concluded with the championship game on April 7, 2013, at Philips Arena in Atlanta as part of the festivities for the 75th anniversary of the NCAA Tournament. The Amherst Lord Jeffs defeated the Mary Hardin–Baylor Crusaders 87–70 in the championship game. The quarterfinal and semifinal rounds were held in Salem Civic Center in Salem, Virginia, the traditional Final Four host.

Qualified teams

Automatic qualifiers 
The following teams were automatic qualifiers for the 2013 NCAA field by virtue of winning their conference's tournament (except for the UAA, whose regular-season champion received the automatic bid).

At-large qualifiers 
The NCAA Selection Committee, by rule, must select one team from the conferences without automatic berths and non-affiliated schools (Pool B). The Selection Committee makes the remaining 19 selections at-large from all conferences (Pool C).

Bracket 

* – Denotes overtime period

Unless otherwise noted, all times listed are Eastern Daylight Time (UTC-04)

St. Paul, MN Sectional

Williamstown, MA Sectional

Spokane, WA Sectional

St. Mary's City, MD Sectional 

Due to an NCAA ban on postseason games in New Jersey, the first round match between top-seeded Ramapo and Morrisville State was held in Nyack, NY on the campus of Nyack College.

Amherst, MA Sectional 

Due to an NCAA ban on postseason games in New Jersey, Stevens was unable to host its first round match between against Randolph-Macon. The match was moved to Bronx, NY on the campus of Lehman College.

Due to a scheduling conflicting, WPI could not host its second round match against Randolph–Macon. The match was moved to Assumption College, also located in Worcester, MA.

Wooster, OH Sectional

Naperville, IL Sectional

Middlebury, VT Sectional

Elite Eight - Salem, Virginia and Atlanta, Georgia

Record by conference

The R62, R32, S16, E8, F4, CG, NC columns indicate how many teams from each conference were in the round of 62 (first round), round of 32 (second round), Sweet 16, Elite Eight, Final Four, championship game, and national champion, respectively.
The ASC and NESCAC each had one representative which earned a bye to the second round.
The AMCC, CCC, CUNYAC, GNAC, IIAC, Liberty League, MAC Freedom, MASCAC, MWC, North Atlantic, NACC, NECC, OAC, Presidents', SAA, SCIAC, Skyline, SLIAC, and UMAC each had one representative, eliminated in the second round with a record of 0–1.
The Heartland and NJAC had two representatives, eliminated in the first round, with a record of 0–2.

See also
2013 NCAA Division I men's basketball tournament
2013 NCAA Division II men's basketball tournament

References

NCAA Division III men's basketball tournament
2012–13 NCAA Division III men's basketball season
NCAA Division III men's basketball tournament